Fay Peak is a double-summit mountain located in Mount Rainier National Park, in Pierce County of Washington state. The 6,492-foot elevation summit of Fay Peak lies a quarter-mile west of the highest point, East Fay Peak, . Echo Rock is its nearest higher neighbor,  to the southeast. Precipitation runoff from Fay Peak is drained by Cataract Creek on the east side of the mountain, and the west side drains into Mowich Lake and Mowich River.

Climate

Fay Peak is located in the marine west coast climate zone of western North America. Most weather fronts originate in the Pacific Ocean, and travel northeast toward the Cascade Mountains. As fronts approach, they are forced upward by the peaks of the Cascade Range (Orographic lift), causing them to drop their moisture in the form of rain or snowfall onto the Cascades. As a result, the west side of the Cascades experiences high precipitation, especially during the winter months in the form of snowfall. During winter months, weather is usually cloudy, but, due to high pressure systems over the Pacific Ocean that intensify during summer months, there is often little or no cloud cover during the summer. The months July through September offer the most favorable weather for viewing or climbing this peak.

History

This mountain's name honors Fay Fuller (1869–1958), the first woman to stand atop the summit of Mount Rainier. Her first successful ascent occurred on August 10, 1890, and her second on July 27, 1897. The name Fay Peak first appeared on a map of the mountain published in 1895. The toponym was officially adopted in 1913 by the United States Board on Geographic Names.

The first ascent of this peak was made August 15, 1884, by J. Warner Fobes, George James, and R. O. Wells.

See also

 Geology of the Pacific Northwest

Gallery

References

External links
 National Park Service web site: Mount Rainier National Park
 Fay Peak: weather forecast

Cascade Range
Mountains of Pierce County, Washington
Mountains of Washington (state)
Mount Rainier National Park
North American 1000 m summits